The olive python (Liasis olivaceus) is a species of snake in the family Pythonidae. The species is endemic to Australia. Two subspecies are recognized, including the nominate subspecies described here.

Description
With adults reaching over 4 m (13 ft) in total length (including the tail), L. olivaceus is Australia's third-largest snake species (surpassed only by the amethystine python and Oenpelli python). Its high number of dorsal scale rows (61–72 at midbody), makes the skin look smoother than that of other pythons. The number of ventral scales is 355–377. The colour pattern is a uniform chocolate brown to olive green, while the belly is usually cream-coloured. The adult weight is typically , and a large female can exceed  in captivity.

Unfortunately, this species is occasionally confused with the venomous king brown snake, Pseudechis australis, and may be mistakenly killed based on the misidentification.

Distribution and habitat
L. olivaceus is found in Western Australia, the Northern Territory, and Queensland. The type locality given is "North Australia; Port Essington" (Northern Territory, Australia).

Habitat
The olive python occurs in rocky areas, gorges, and especially rocky areas near sources of water. Typically, shelter is sought in caves and rock crevices, but individuals have also been found in hollow logs and burrows under rocks.

Diet
The diet of L. olivaceus consists of birds (ducks and spinifex pigeons), mammals (including rock wallabies and fruit bats), and other reptiles. It prefers to lie in wait next to an animal trail to ambush its prey. Alternatively, it is a strong swimmer and also hunts in waterholes, striking at prey from under the water. 

It is also known to prey on monitor lizards and juvenile crocodiles.

Reproduction
Mating activity of olive pythons starts in May and continues until mid-July. When successful, this is followed by a gestation period of 81–85 days, after which the oviparous female lays 12–40 eggs in late spring. The average clutch size is around 19 eggs. The hatchlings emerge after an incubation period around 50 days, each measuring about 35 cm in length.

Subspecies

Captivity 
The olive python is often kept as a pet and is bred in captivity. If raised properly, it is noted to be friendly, curious, and calm. In removing it from its enclosure, snake hooks be used so as to prevent the feeding response from being triggered, and once out, it can generally be freely handled calmly due to its placid nature.

Images

References

Further reading
Barker DG, Barker TM (1994). Pythons of the World. Volume I. Australia. Lakeside, California: Advanced Vivarium Systems. xviii + 171 pp.
Boulenger GA (1893). Catalogue of the Snakes in the British Museum (Natural History). Volume I., Containing the Families ... Boidæ ... London: Trustees of the British Museum (Natural History). (Taylor and Francis, printers). xiii + 448 pp. + Plates I-XXVIII. (Liasis olivaceus, p. 79 + Plate IV, figure 2).
Cogger HG (2014). Reptiles and Amphibians of Australia, Seventh Edition. Clayton, Victoria, Australia: CSIRO Publishing. xxx + 1,033 pp. .
Gray JE (1842). "Synopsis of the species of prehensile-tailed Snakes, or Family Boidæ". Zoological Miscellany 2: 41–46. (Liasis olivacea, new species, p. 45).
Reynolds, R. Graham; Niemiller, Matthew L.; Revell, Liam J. (2014). "Toward a Tree-of-Life for the boas and pythons: Multilocus species-level phylogeny with unprecedented taxon sampling". Molecular Phylogenetics and Evolution 71: 201–213.
Smith LA (1981). "A revision of the Liasis olivaceus species-group (Serpentes: Boidae) in Western Australia". Records of the Western Australian Museum 9 (2): 227–233. (Liasis olivaceus barroni, new subspecies, pp. 231–233, Figure 2).
Wilson, Steve; Swan, Gerry (2013). A Complete Guide to Reptiles of Australia, Fourth Edition. Sydney: New Holland Publishers. 522 pp. .

External links
Video of a wild Olive Python in Kakadu National Park, NT
 
Photo of wild Olive Python attempting to eat wallaby

olivaceus
Reptiles of Western Australia
Reptiles described in 1842
Taxa named by John Edward Gray
Snakes of Australia